White Hills is a semi-rural locality and town in the local government areas of Launceston and Northern Midlands, in the Northern and Central regions of Tasmania. The 2016 census determined a population of 182 for the state suburb of White Hills.

History
The name is believed to be related to the large number of white cockatoos in the area when it was first settled. It was gazetted as a locality in 1959.

Geography
The North Esk River passes through the north-east corner and forms most of the northern boundary.

Road infrastructure
Route C401 route (Blessington Road) enters from the north-west and runs through the locality and town before exiting to the south-east. The C412 route (White Hills Road) starts at an intersection with C401 in the north-west and exits to the south-west. The C414 route (Sawpit Hill Road) starts at an intersection with C401 in the south-east and exits to the south-east.

References

Launceston, Tasmania
Localities of Northern Midlands Council
Localities of City of Launceston
Towns in Tasmania